Zinc finger protein 585B is a protein that in humans is encoded by the ZNF585B gene.

References

Further reading 

Human proteins